The Avenue Verte/Greenway is a joint Anglo-French initiative assisted by Europe, to develop a largely traffic-free route between Paris and London (via the Dieppe – Newhaven ferry) for cyclists, walkers and horse riders. A route was put in place in time for the 2012 London Olympic Games.  The route is not yet finalised and several sections are noted on the Avenue Verte website as being temporary.

England 

In England, the route would follow the National Cycle Network (NCN) Route 21 between London and the South Coast. In East Sussex, the Avenue Verte incorporates existing paths including the Cuckoo Trail and Forest Way, offering more than 30 km of traffic-free cycling, walking and horse riding along former railway lines.

The route would continue to Newhaven as NCN Route 2, along the South Coast, into West Sussex to the West and Kent to the East.

North of East Sussex, the route would follow NCN 21 through West Sussex, Surrey and into London. Here, the route would pass through several boroughs before ending at London Eye.

The majority of the route on the English side is unpaved and in parts in so poor condition that it is not suitable for roadbikes, instead a hybrid, touring bike or a gravel bike, all with wider tires would be most suited.

France 

In France, the Avenue Verte follows the former Dieppe to Paris railway for 40 km. It currently starts just outside Dieppe at Arques-la-Bataille and stops again just outside Forges-les-Eaux but once complete, the route will extend to Paris almost entirely on traffic-free routes.

Directions: Leaving the ferry terminal at Dieppe, head towards the town centre. At the harbour bridge you will see signs for Avenue Verte and D1.

References

External links 
 http://www.avenuevertelondonparis.co.uk
 East Sussex Council Presentation
 BBC News
 https://sites.google.com/site/avenueverteparislondres/
 https://sites.google.com/site/avenuevertelondresparis/

Cycling in London
Cycleways in England
Cycling in Paris
Cycling in France
Long-distance cycling routes